Hastula tenuicolorata is a species of sea snail, a marine gastropod mollusc in the family Terebridae, the auger snails.

Description
The length of the shell varies between 8 mm and 13 mm.

Distribution
This marine species occurs off Madagascar

References

 Bozzetti L. (2008). Six new Terebridae (Gastropoda: Neogastropoda: Terebridae) from southern Madagascar. Malacologia Mostra Mondiale, 60: 9–14

Terebridae
Gastropods described in 2008